The Battle of Courbevoie was the first battle of the 1871 Paris Commune.

Skirmish 

Two days into the Commune, on 30 March, exploratory Versaillais troops arrived at a Communard post on the approaches of Courbevoie, near Neuilly-sur-Seine. The troops hesitated when General Gaston Galliffet ordered them to fire. Galliffet charged on horseback, taking prisoners as the Commune retreated. This rallying of pro-government troops made the soldiers more willing to fire on fellow Frenchmen. President Adolphe Thiers, reassured, ordered their return without attempting to capture more Communards.

Battle 

Galliffet returned with two brigades on 2 April to attack Courbevoie's Rond-Point. A Versaillais military surgeon general, attempting to negotiate, was killed on approach by Communards who mistook his uniform for that of a colonel. A battle ensued.

The Versaillais won the battle and took Courbevoie. When government forces fell back, some Communards mistakenly believed their side was victorious. The Versaillais had captured 30 Communards, five of whom became the first to be summarily executed.

Impact 

Communards who fell back to Paris reported on Joseph Vinoy's orders for all those captured to be shot. In response, the Council of the Commune ordered a sortie counterattack. Later on April 2, the Commune informed the National Guard that the Versaillais had provoked civil war. The Versaillais' willingness to execute Communards marked a turning point for the Communards, convincing them that Thiers would use unrestricted warfare and that Paris must be defended.

The death of the military surgeon general was used in Versaillais propaganda.

References

Bibliography 

 

Paris Commune
19th century in Paris
Courbevoie
Courbevoie
History of Hauts-de-Seine
April 1871 events